Soichiro Nakano (born 2 March 1998) is a Japanese karateka. He won one of the bronze medals in the men's 67 kg event at the 2021 World Karate Championships held in Dubai, United Arab Emirates.

He won the silver medal in the men's 67 kg event at the 2018 World University Karate Championships held in Kobe, Japan. He also won the gold medal in the men's team kumite event. In December 2021, he won the gold medal in his event at the Asian Karate Championships held in Almaty, Kazakhstan.

He competed in the men's kumite 67 kg event at the 2022 World Games held in Birmingham, United States.

References 

Living people
1998 births
Place of birth missing (living people)
Japanese male karateka
Competitors at the 2022 World Games
21st-century Japanese people